Hunter's Bottom Historic District is a  historic district in Kentucky's Carroll and Trimble counties, spanning the area known as Hunter's Bottom.  It was listed on the National Register of Historic Places in 1976.  The listing included 21 contributing buildings and a contributing site.

Hunter's Bottom runs seven miles along the Ohio River, with the river forming the north boundary, and with the base of hills forming
the south boundary.  The district stops on the east at Locust Creek in Carroll County, and on the west at Canip Creek in
Trimble County.

References

National Register of Historic Places in Carroll County, Kentucky
National Register of Historic Places in Trimble County, Kentucky
Georgian architecture in Kentucky
Federal architecture in Kentucky
Victorian architecture in Kentucky
Buildings and structures completed in 1801
Historic districts on the National Register of Historic Places in Kentucky